Long Beach Police Department may refer to:

Long Beach Police Department (California) in California, United States
Long Beach Police Department (Indiana) in Indiana, United States
Long Beach Police Department (Mississippi) in Mississippi, United States
Long Beach Police Department (New York) in New York, United States
Long Beach Police Department (Washington) in Washington, United States
Long Beach Township Police Department in New Jersey, United States